Dieudonné Datonou (born 3 March 1962) is a beninese archbishop of the Catholic Church who has worked in the diplomatic service of the Holy See since 1995. On 7 October 2021 he was appointed Apostolic Nuncio to Burundi and elevated to the rank of archbishop.

He is the first native of Benin to hold the title of nuncio.

Biography
Dieudonné K. Datonou was born in Dekanmè, Benin, on 3 March 1962. He was ordained a priest of the Archdiocese of Cotonou on 7 December 1989. He earned a degree in civil and canon law from the Pontifical Lateran University in 1995 with a dissertation "Du concept de patrimoine commun de l’humanité aux droits de l’humanité. Étude historico-juridique du concept de patrimoine commun de l’humanité en droit international".

He entered the diplomatic service of the Holy See on 1 July 1995. He has filled assignments in the offices of its representatives in Angola (1995–1998), Ecuador (1998–2001), Cameroon (secretary, 2001–2004), Iran (2004–2006), India and Nepal (2006–2009), and El Salvador (2009–2014). He also worked in the Section for General Affairs of the Secretariat of State where in 2021 he became coordinator of papal travels. He was responsible for organizing Pope Francis' trip to Iraq in March 2021 and to Hungary and Slovakia in September 2021. His Vatican colleagues nicknamed him "the sheriff".

On 12 September 2021, during a press conference while en route to Budapest, Pope Francis mentioned that Datonou would soon become a bishop. On 7 October 2021, Pope Francis named him Apostolic Nuncio to Burundi and titular archbishop of Vico Equense. On 20 November 2021, he received episcopal consecration by cardinal Pietro Parolin, co-consecrators cardinal Luis Antonio Tagle and archbishop Edgar Peña Parra.

Selected works

See also
 List of heads of the diplomatic missions of the Holy See

References
 

1962 births
Living people
Beninese people
Beninese clergy

Pontifical Lateran University alumni
Officials of the Roman Curia
Apostolic Nuncios to Burundi